My Story Classical is a compilation with classical versions of songs from Ayumi Hamasaki's album My Story. My Story Classical was released on March 24, 2005. Most of the tracks were recorded with the Lamoureux Orchestra of France, which was conducted by Yutaka Sado.

Track listing
 "Wonderland"
 "Moments"
 "Happy Ending"
 "Game"
 "Hope or Pain"
 "Kaleidoscope"
 "Carols"
 "Walking Proud"
 "Catcher in the Light"
 "Honey"
 "Winding Road"
 [Bonus track] "A Song Is Born" (originally from the album "I Am...")

Chart positions
Like all of Hamasaki's previous classical albums, My Story Classical managed to peak in the top 10. It peaked at #4 on the Oricon album chart. This is a huge step up from her last classical album Ayu-mi-x 4 + Selection Acoustic Orchestra Version which peaked at #9, and her previous remix album series including Ayu-mi-x 5, Ayu Trance 3 and Ayu-ro mix 3 which all failed to reach the top 10.

Total Sales: 81,700 (Japan)

External links
 My Story Classical information at Avex Network.
 My Story Classical information at Oricon.

Ayumi Hamasaki remix albums
2005 remix albums